Uncapher is a surname. Notable people with the surname include: 

Keith Uncapher (1922–2002), American computer engineer and manager
Rick Uncapher (born 1970), American bass player